The Battle of Amoaful was a battle fought on 31 January 1874 during the Third Anglo-Ashanti War when Sir Garnet Wolseley defeated the Ashantis after strong resistance. The attack was led by the 42nd Regiment of Foot. At Amoaful, one combat post-mortem pays tribute to the Ashanti commander: "The great Chief Amanquatia was among the killed. Admirable skill was shown in the position selected by Amanquatia, and the determination and generalship he displayed in the defence fully bore out his great reputation as an able tactician and gallant soldier." Lance-Sergeant Samuel McGaw was awarded the Victoria Cross for action during the battle.

References

Amoaful
Amoaful
1874 in Africa
Amoaful